Thomas Clerke (c. 1485 – 2 March 1555), of Wookey, Somerset, and London, was an English politician.

Family
Clerke was the second son of Clement Clerke of Great Livermere and Bury St Edmunds, Suffolk, and his wife, Alice. Thomas was probably educated at Bury St Edmunds Grammar School and at the University of Cambridge. By 1523, he had married a woman named Antonia, and they had two sons and two daughters. One of their sons, John Clerke, was MP for Bath, Somerset in the same year his father represented Wells.

Career
He was a Member (MP) of the Parliament of England for Wells in 1547.

References

1485 births
1555 deaths
English MPs 1547–1552
People from Mendip District